Siiri Nordin (born 15 October 1980) is a Finnish singer. She was the lead singer of the now defunct Finnish rock band Killer.

Biography 
Nordin was born in Helsinki. In 2003, she had a solo hit with the song "Sydämeni osuman sai", included on the soundtrack of the movie Helmiä ja sikoja. The song is a cover version of the David and Jonathan hit song "Something's Gotten Hold of My Heart".

In 2004, Nordin took a break from music and took up boat carpentry. She entered a civil union with her girlfriend, Mirja, in the autumn. She has also worked as a taxi driver.

In April 2006, she released a solo album called Me Too, released by the Finnish label, Next Big Thing. In March 2008, she released the Finnish-language album Lyö Tahtia.

Nordin participated in the 2011 Dancing with the Stars Compatible 6 with Jani Rasimus as her partner.

In 2017, she moved from Helsinki to the village of Matildan in southwest Finland.

Discography

Albums 

 2006, Me Too
 2008, Lyö Tahtia

References

1980 births
Living people
Singers from Helsinki
21st-century Finnish women singers
Lesbian singers
Finnish lesbian musicians
Finnish LGBT singers
20th-century LGBT people
21st-century LGBT people